Uwe Gronostay (25 October 1939 – 29 November 2008) was a German choral conductor and composer.

Born in  Hildesheim, he grew up in Braunschweig and was already organist of the Jakobikirche at age 15. He studied church music in Bremen and worked as church musician, organ teacher and freelance worker for Radio Bremen. In 1972 he was appointed director of the RIAS Kammerchor.

He was a professor of choral conducting in Frankfurt, later from 1989 and 2003 at the Hochschule der Künste Berlin.

External links 

 
 
 „Chordirigent und Chorerzieher von Rang – Uwe Gronostay ist tot“, Neue Musikzeitung-online, 2 December 2008 

German male conductors (music)
1939 births
2008 deaths
Musicians from Braunschweig
Academic staff of the Berlin University of the Arts
20th-century German conductors (music)
20th-century German male musicians